Charles Henry Gausden (1826 – 5 September 1886) was an English cricketer.  Gausden's batting style is unknown.  He was born at Brasted, Kent.

Gausden made his first-class debut for Sussex against the Marylebone Cricket Club in 1847.  He made four further first-class appearances for the county, the last of which came against the Marylebone Cricket Club in 1851.  In his five first-class matches, he scored 41 runs at an average of 5.85, with a high score of 17.

He died at St Leonards-on-Sea, Sussex in 1886.

References

External links
Charles Gausden at ESPNcricinfo
Charles Gausden at CricketArchive

1826 births
1886 deaths
People from Brasted
English cricketers
Sussex cricketers